Skalsko is a municipality and village in Mladá Boleslav District in the Central Bohemian Region of the Czech Republic. It has about 400 inhabitants. Most of the village has well preserved character and is protected by law as a village monument zone.

Geography
It lies in the Jizera Table.

History
The first written mention of Skalsko is from 1352. From 1632 to 1785, the village was property of the Servite Order. The Servits had built here a castle as their summer residence. From 1809 to 1843, Skalsko was owned by Count Karel of Rohan. The last feudal owners were the Thurn und Taxis family.

Transport
The railway from Mladá Boleslav to Mělník passes through the edge of the municipality.

Sights
The landmark of Skalsko is the Church of Saint Gall. It was built in the 14th century and rebuilt in the Baroque style in the first half of the 18th century.

The Skalsko Castle was originally a Baroque building from the 17th century, rebuilt in the Neoclassical style in 1878. Today it houses a secondary school.

Most of the village is protected as a village monument zone for its set of timber buildings dating from the 18th to the beginning of the 19th century, supplemented by other valuable buildings from the first half 19th century.

Gallery

References

External links

Villages in Mladá Boleslav District